The following list is a discography of production by American hip hop record producer and recording artist the RZA. It includes a list of songs produced, co-produced and remixed by year, artist, album and title.

1991

The Genius – Words from the Genius 
 01. "Pass the Bone" (featuring Prince Rakeem) [released on 1994 re-issue version]
 17. "Words from the Genius" (Prince Rakeem Remix) [released on 2006 re-issue version]

Prince Rakeem – Ooh I Love You Rakeem 
 01. "Ooh we Love you Rakeem" (Baggin' Ladies Mix)
 03. "Deadly Venoms" (Vocals Up)
 04. "Sexcapades" (DMD Mix) (co-produced with Easy Mo Bee)
 05. "Sexcapades" (Wu-Tang Mix) (co-produced Easy Mo Bee)

1993

N-Tyce – Hush Hush Tip / Root Beer Float 12" 
 A1. "Hush Hush Tip" (feat. Method Man) (co-produced by 4th Disciple)
 B1. "Root Beer Float" (co-produced by 4th Disciple)

Wu-Tang Clan – Enter the Wu-Tang (36 Chambers) 
 01. "Bring da Ruckus"
 02. "Shame on a Nigga"
 03. "Clan in da Front"
 04. "Wu-Tang: 7th Chamber"
 05. "Can It Be All So Simple"
 06. "Da Mystery of Chessboxin'" (co-produced by Ol' Dirty Bastard) 
 07. "Wu-Tang Clan Ain't Nuthing ta Fuck Wit" (co-produced by Method Man)
 08. "C.R.E.A.M."
 09. "Method Man"
 10. "Protect Ya Neck"
 11. "Tearz"
 12. "Wu-Tang: 7th Chamber—Part II"

1994

Gravediggaz – 6 Feet Deep 
 09. "Diary of a Madman" (co-produced by The Undertaker and RNS)
 13. "Graveyard Chamber"
 15. "6 Feet Deep"
 00. "1–800 Suicide (Poisonous Mix)" [released on the 6 Feet Deep EP] 
 00. "Mommy What's A Gravedigga? (RZA Clean Mix)" [released on the Mommy, What's A Gravedigga? CDS]

Method Man – Tical 
 01. "Tical"  
 02. "Biscuits"
 03. "Bring the Pain"  
 04. "All I Need"  
 05. "What the Blood Clot" 
 06. "Meth vs. Chef" (featuring Raekwon)
 07. "Sub Crazy"  (co-produced by  4th Disciple) 
 08. "Release Yo' Delf" (featuring Blue Raspberry)
 09. "P.L.O. Style" (featuring Carlton Fisk) (co-produced by Method Man)
 10. "I Get My Thang in Action" 
 11. "Mr. Sandman" (featuring RZA, Inspectah Deck, Streetlife, Carlton Fisk and Blue Raspberry)
 12. "Stimulation"  
 13. "Method Man (Remix)"

Scientifik – Criminal 
 07. "As Long as you Know" (feat. Ed O.G.)

Shaquille O'Neal – Shaq Fu: Da Return 
 01. "No Hook" (feat. Method Man & RZA)
 00. "No Hook (RZA's Remix)" [released on 12"]

Shyheim – AKA the Rugged Child 
 12. "Little Rascals"

1995

Cypress Hill – Temples of Boom 
 05. "Killa Hill Niggas" (feat. RZA and U-God)

GZA – Liquid Swords 
 01. "Liquid Swords"  
 02. "Duel of the Iron Mic" (featuring Ol' Dirty Bastard, Masta Killa & Inspectah Deck) 
 03. "Living in the World Today"
 04. "Gold"
 05. "Cold World" (featuring Inspectah Deck) 
 06. "Labels"  
 07. "4th Chamber" (featuring Ghostface Killah, Killah Priest & RZA) 
 08. "Shadowboxin'" (featuring Method Man) 
 09. "Hell's Wind Staff / Killah Hills 10304"  
 10. "Investigative Reports" (featuring U-God, Raekwon & Ghostface Killah) 
 11. "Swordsman"
 12. "I Gotcha Back"
 00. "Cold World (RZA Mix)" [released on the Cold World CDS] 
 00. "Labels (Remix)" [released on the Labels 12"]

Method Man – I'll Be There for You/You're All I Need to Get By 
 03. "I'll Be There for You/You're All I Need to Get By (Razor Sharp Mix)" (feat. Mary J. Blige)

Method Man – The Riddler 12" 
 B1. "The Riddler (Hide-Out Remix)" DJ Etch-A-Sketch, the RZA's Assistant also known as "DivineMaster" of The Wu-Elements should have been credited for this record. He produced the original version of this Method Man hit single and RZA co-produced the remix.  DJ Etch-A-Sketch also came to be known as "DJ Riddler" when RZA confirmed that this in fact was the truth, on the "Batman Forever" Movie Soundtrack, at Chung King Studios, NYC.

Ol' Dirty Bastard – Return to the 36 Chambers: The Dirty Version 
 01. "Intro"  
 02. "Shimmy Shimmy Ya" 
 03. "Baby, C'mon" 
 05. "Hippa to da Hoppa"  
 06. "Raw Hide" (featuring Raekwon & Method Man)
 07. "Damage" (featuring GZA) (co-produced by 4th Disciple, Ol' Dirty Bastard, and Ethan Ryman)
 08. "Don't U Know" (featuring Killah Priest)  
 09. "The Stomp" (co-produced by 4th Disciple, Ol' Dirty Bastard, and Ethan Ryman)
 10. "Goin' Down" 
 11. "Drunk Game (Sweet Sugar Pie)" (co-produced by 4th Disciple, Ol' Dirty Bastard, and Ethan Ryman)
 12. "Snakes" (featuring Killah Priest, RZA, Masta Killa & Buddha Monk)
 13. "Brooklyn Zoo II (Tiger Crane)" (featuring Ghostface Killah)
 14. "Proteck Ya Neck II The Zoo" (featuring Brooklyn Zu)
 15. "Cuttin' Headz" (featuring RZA) 
 16. "Dirty Dancin'" (featuring Method Man) [CD bonus track]
 00. "Give It To Ya Raw" [released on the Brooklyn Zoo 12"]
 00. "Don't U Know, Part II" [released on the O.D.B.E.P.]

Raekwon – Only Built 4 Cuban Linx... 
 01. "Striving for Perfection" 
 02. "Knuckleheadz" (featuring Ghostface Killah & U-God) 
 03. "Knowledge God" 
 04. "Criminology" (featuring Ghostface Killah)
 05. "Incarcerated Scarfaces" 
 06. "Rainy Dayz" (featuring Ghostface Killah & Blue Raspberry) 
 07. "Guillotine (Swordz)" (featuring Inspectah Deck, Ghostface Killah & GZA)
 08. "Can It Be All So Simple (Remix)" (featuring Ghostface Killah) 
 09. "Shark Niggas (Biters)" 
 10. "Ice Water" (featuring Ghostface Killah & Cappadonna)
 11. "Glaciers of Ice" (featuring Masta Killa & Ghostface Killah) 
 12. "Verbal Intercourse" (featuring Nas & Ghostface Killah)
 13. "Wisdom Body" (featuring Ghostface Killah)
 14. "Spot Rusherz" 
 15. "Ice Cream" (featuring Method Man, Ghostface Killah & Cappadonna)
 16. "Wu-Gambinos" (featuring Method Man, RZA, Masta Killa & Ghostface Killah)
 17. "Heaven & Hell" (featuring Ghostface Killah) 
 18. "North Star (Jewels)" [CD bonus track]

Tricky / Gravediggaz – The Hell E.P. 
 03. "Psychosis" (co-produced by Tricky)
 04. "Tonight is a Special Night" (co-produced by Tricky and Dobie)

Various artists – Batman Forever (soundtrack) 
 10. "The Riddler" – performed by Method Man

1996

AZ – Doe or Die Remix 12" 
 A1. "Doe Or Die (RZA Remix)" (feat. Raekwon)
 A2. "Doe Or Die (Hardcore Remix)"
 A3. "Doe Or Die (TV Track)"
 B1. "Doe Or Die (Rumble Remix)"
 B3. "Doe Or Die (Allout Remix)"

Bounty Killer – My Xperience 
 09. "War Face (Ask Fi War) Remix" (feat. Raekwon)

Dog Eat Dog – Play Games 
 05. "Step Right in" (feat. RZA)

Ghostface Killah – Ironman 
 01. "Iron Maiden" (featuring Raekwon & Cappadonna) 
 02. "Wildflower"  
 03. "The Faster Blade" (featuring Raekwon)
 04. "260" 
 05. "Assassination Day" (featuring Inspectah Deck, RZA, Raekwon & Masta Killa)  
 06. "Poisonous Darts"
 07. "Winter Warz" (featuring Raekwon, U-God, Masta Killa & Cappadonna)  
 08. "Box in Hand" (featuring Raekwon & Method Man) 
 10. "Camay" (featuring Cappadonna & Raekwon)
 11. "Daytona 500" (featuring Raekwon & Cappadonna) 
 12. "Motherless Child" (featuring Raekwon) 
 13. "Black Jesus" (featuring Raekwon & U-God) 
 14. "After the Smoke Is Clear" (featuring The Delfonics, Raekwon & RZA) 
 15. "All That I Got Is You" (featuring Mary J. Blige) 
 16. "The Soul Controller"
 17. "Marvel" (featuring RZA)
 00. "Deadly Darts" (feat. Method Man and Streetlife) [Album leftover track]

Killarmy – Camouflage Ninjas / Wake Up 12" 
 B1. "Wake Up"

Shyheim – The Lost Generation 
 14. "Young Godz"

Various artists – America Is Dying Slowly 
 03. "America" – performed by Wu-Tang Clan & Killah Priest

Various artists – The Great White Hype (soundtrack) 
 05. "Who's the Champion"- performed by Ghostface Killah, RZA and Raekwon

Various artists – High School High (soundtrack) 
 03. "Wu-Wear: The Garment Renaissance" – performed by RZA, Method Man & Cappadonna
 18. "Semi-Automatic: Full Rap Metal Jacket" – performed by Inspectah Deck, U-God & Streetlife

Various artists – Sunset Park (soundtrack) 
 02. "Motherless Child" - performed by Ghostface Killah & Raekwon

1997

Björk – Bachelorette CDS 
 02. "Bachelorette (RZA Remix)"

Cappadonna – '97 Mentality 12" 
 A1. "'97 Mentality" (featuring Ghostface Killah)

Gravediggaz – The Pick, the Sickle and the Shovel 
 01. "Intro"
 02. "Dangerous Mindz" (co-produced by 4th Disciple)
 08. "Pit of Snakes" (co-produced by True Master)
 09. "The Night The Earth Cried" (co-produced by 4th Disciple)
 13. "What's Goin' On?"

Killarmy – Silent Weapons for Quiet Wars 
 08. "Wake Up"
 16. "War Face"

The Notorious B.I.G. – Life After Death 
 2–11. "Long Kiss Goodnight"

Sunz Of Man – We Can't Be Touched / Natural High 12" 
 B1. "Natural High"

Various artists – Hoodlum (soundtrack) 
 05. "Dirty the Moocher" – performed by Wu-Tang Clan

Various artists – I Got the Hook-Up (soundtrack) 
 14. "Who Rock This" – performed by Ol' Dirty Bastard, Mystikal & Master P)

Various artists – In tha Beginning...There Was Rap 
 01. "Sucker M.C.'s" – performed by Wu-Tang Clan

Various artists – Rhyme & Reason (soundtrack) 
 07. "Tragedy" – performed by RZA

Various artists – Soul in the Hole (soundtrack) 
 02. "Diesel" – performed by Wu-Tang Clan

Wu-Tang Clan – Wu-Tang Forever 
Disc 1:
 01. "Wu-Revolution"
 02. "Reunited"
 03. "For Heaven's Sake"
 06. "As High as Wu-Tang Get"
 07. "Severe Punishment"
 09. "Maria"
 11. "It's Yourz"
Disc 2:
 01. "Intro"
 02. "Triumph"
 03. "Impossible" (co-produced by 4th Disciple)
 04. "Little Ghetto Boys"
 05. "Deadly Melody"
 07. "The Projects"
 08. "Bells of War"
 10. "Dog Shit"
 11. "Duck Seazon"
 12. "Hellz Wind Staff"
 14. "Black Shampoo"
 15. "Second Coming"
 16. "The Closing"
 17. "Sunshower" [international track only]
 18. "	Projects (International Remix)" [international track only]

1998

AZ – Pieces of a Man 
 13. "Whatever Happened (The Birth)" (featuring RZA)

Big Pun – Capital Punishment 
 21. "Tres Leches (Triboro Trilogy)" (featuring Prodigy and Inspectah Deck)

Cappadonna – The Pillage  
 03. "Run"
 04. "Blood on Blood War"
 06. "MCF"
 13. "Young Hearts"
 15. "Pump Your Fist"

Deadly Venoms  – Antidote 
 15. "	Ready" (featuring Tekitha)
 16. "Rap Scholar" (featuring Jamie Sommers & La The Darkman)

La the Darkman – Heist of the Century 
 13. "Polluted Wisdom"

Method Man – Tical 2000: Judgement Day 
 02. "Perfect World"
 10. "Suspect Chin Music" (featuring Streetlife)
 11. "Retro Godfather"
 16. "Party Crasher" (co-produced by True Master)

RZA – Bobby Digital in Stereo 
 01. "Intro"
 02. "B.O.B.B.Y."
 03. "Unspoken Word"
 04. "Slow-Grind African"
 07. "N.Y.C. Everything" (featuring Method Man)
 08. "Mantis" (featuring Masta Killa & Tekitha)
 09. "Slow-Grind French"
 10. "Holocaust (Silkworm)" (featuring Holocaust, Doc Doom, Ghostface Killah & Ms. Roxy)
 11. "Terrorist" (featuring Dom Pachino, P.R. Terrorist, Doc Doom & Killa Sin)
 12. "Bobby Did It (Spanish Fly)" (featuring Islord, Timbo King, Ghostface Killah & Jamie Sommers)
 13. "Handwriting on the Wall" (featuring Ras Kass)
 15. "Slow-Grind Italian"
 16. "My Lovin' Is Digi" (featuring The Force M.D.s & Ms. Roxy)
 17. "Domestic Violence" (featuring Jamie Sommers & U-God)
 18. "Project Talk" (featuring Kinetic 9)
 19. "Lab Drunk"
 20. "Fuck What You Think" (featuring Islord & 9th Prince)
 21. "Daily Routine" (featuring Kinetic 9)
 22. "Do You Hear the Bells?" [Bonus track]

Shyheim – Co-Defendant 12" 
 A1. "Co-Defendant" (feat. Hell Raiza)

Sunz of Man – The Last Shall Be First 
 08. "Tribulations"
 12. "Inmates to the Fire" (feat. Dreddy Kruger)
 15. "Can I See You" (feat. Beretta 9)

Texas – Say What You Want CDS 
 02. "Say What You Want (All Day, Every Day)"

Various artists – Belly (soundtrack) 
 14. "Windpipe" – performed by RZA, Ghostface Killah & Ol' Dirty Bastard

Various artists – Bulworth (soundtrack) 
 06. "The Chase" – performed by RZA

Various artists – The Mix Tape, Vol. III 
 30. "Put Your Hammer Down" – performed by Wu-Tang Clan

Wu-Tang Killa Bees – Wu-Tang Killa Bees: The Swarm 
 02. "Legacy" – performed by Royal Fam
 03. "Concrete Jungle" – performed by Sunz of Man & Timbo King
 04. "Co-Defendant" – performed by Shyheim & Hell Razah
 06. "Execute Them" – performed by Wu-Tang Clan & Streetlife
 08. "And Justice For All" – performed by RZA, Islord, Killa Sin, P.R. Terrorist & Method Man
 15. "'97 Mentality" – performed by Cappadonna & Ghostface Killah

1999

Charli Baltimore – Cold as Ice 
 02. "Stand Up" (feat. Ghostface Killah)
 14. "They"

GZA – Beneath the Surface 
 11. "1112" (featuring Masta Killa, Killah Priest & Njeri Earth)

Inspectah Deck – Uncontrolled Substance 
 02. "Movas & Shakers"
 14. "Friction" (featuring Masta Killa)

Method Man & Redman – Blackout! 
 06. "Cereal Killer" (featuring Blue Raspberry)
 12. "Run 4 Cover" (featuring Ghostface Killah and Streetlife)

Ol' Dirty Bastard – Nigga Please 
 08. "Nigga Please"
 09. "Dirt Dog" (produced with Buddha Monk)
 10. "I Want Pussy"
 13. "Cracker Jack"

Sway & King Tech – This or That 
 26. "Belly of the Beast" (featuring RZA)

U-God – Golden Arms Redemption 
 01. "Enter U-God"
 09. "Stay in Your Lane"
 13. "Turbo Charge"

Various artists – Ghost Dog: The Way of the Samurai (film score) 
 01. "Ghost Dog Theme (W/Dogs & EFX)"
 02. "Opening Theme (Raise Your Sword Instrumental)"
 03. "Flying Birds"
 04. "Samurai Theme"
 05. "Gangsters Theme"
 06. "Dead Birds"
 07. "Fast Shadow (Version 1)" – performed by Wu-Tang Clan
 08. "RZA #7"
 09. "Funky Theme"
 10. "RZA's Theme"
 11. "Samurai Showdown (Raise Your Sword)" – performed by RZA
 12. "Ghost Dog Theme"
 13. "Fast Shadow (Version 2)" – performed by Wu-Tang Clan
 14. "Untitled #8"
 15. "Untitled #12 (Free Jazz)"
 16. "Wu-World Order (Version 1)" – performed by Wu-Tang Clan feat. La The Darkman

Various artists – Ghost Dog: The Way of the Samurai (soundtrack) 

 01. "Samurai Code Quotation" – performed by Forest Whitaker
 02. "Strange Eyes" – performed by Sunz of Man, 12 O'Clock & Blue Raspberry
 03. "4 Sho Sho" – performed by Northstar, RZA & Blue Raspberry
 04. "Zip Code" – performed by Black Knights
 05. "Samurai Code Quotation" – performed by Forest Whitaker
 06. "Cakes" – performed by Kool G Rap
 07. "Samurai Code Quotation" – performed by Forest Whitaker
 08. "Don't Test/Wu Stallion" – performed by Suga Bang Bang
 09. "Walking Through the Darkness" – performed by Tekitha
 10. "The Man" – performed by Masta Killa & Superb
 11. "Samurai Code Quotation" – performed by Forest Whitaker
 12. "Walk The Dogs" – performed by Royal Fam & La the Darkman
 13. "Stay With Me" – performed by Melodie & 12 O'Clock
 14. "East New York Stamp" – performed by Jeru the Damaja & Afu-Ra
 15. "Samurai Code Quotation" – performed by Forest Whitaker
 16. "Fast Shadow" – performed by Wu-Tang Clan
 17. "Samurai Code Quotation" – performed by Forest Whitaker
 18. "Samurai Showdown" – performed by RZA
 19. "Samurai Code Final Quotation" – performed by Forest Whitaker

Various artists – Wu-Tang: Shaolin Style 
(Produced entire soundtrack score, except tracks 3 & 7.)

2000

Ghostface Killah – Supreme Clientele 
 07. "The Grain" (featuring RZA)
 08. "Buck 50" (featuring Method Man, Cappadonna & Redman)
 13. "Stroke of Death" (featuring Solomon Childs & RZA)
 17. "Child's Play"

Northstar / Black Knights – Fo' Sho / Zip Code 12" 
 A1. "Fo' Sho" (feat. RZA)
 B1. "Zip Code"

Ol' Dirty Bastard – I Speak The Truth 12" 
 A1. "I Speak The Truth (Hip-Hop Mix)" (feat. GZA)

Royal Fam – Yesterday, Today, Iz Tomorrow 
 12. "Legacy"

Twigy – リミキシーズ呼吸法 
 09. "病む街 Pt.2 (The RZA Remix)"

Wu-Tang Clan – The W 
 01. "Intro (Shaolin Finger Jab) / Chamber Music"
 02. "Careful (Click, Click)"
 03. "Hollow Bones"
 04. "Redbull" (feat. Redman)
 05. "One Blood Under W" (feat. Junior Reid)
 06. "Conditioner" (feat. Snoop Dogg)
 07. "Protect Ya Neck (The Jump Off)"
 08. "Let My Niggas Live" (feat. Nas)
 09. "I Can't Go to Sleep" (feat. Isaac Hayes)
 11. "The Monument" (feat. Busta Rhymes)
 12. "Gravel Pit"
 13. "Jah World"

2001

Doc Gyneco – Quality Street 
 06. "Cousins" (feat. Cilvaringz & RZA)

Ghostface Killah – Bulletproof Wallets 
 02. "Maxine" (featuring Raekwon)
 03. "Flowers" (featuring Raekwon, Method Man & Superb)
 11. "Walking Through The Darkness" (featuring Tekitha)
 12. "Jealousy"

RZA – Digital Bullet 
 01. "Show You Love"
 02. "Can't Lose" (featuring Beretta 9)
 03. "Glocko Pop" (featuring Method Man, Masta Killa & Street Life)
 04. "Must Be Bobby"
 05. "Brooklyn Babies" (featuring The Force M.D.s & Masta Killa)
 07. "Do U" (featuring Prodigal Sunn & GZA)
 08. "Fools" (featuring Killa Sin & Solomon Childs)
 10. "Black Widow Pt. 2" (featuring Ol' Dirty Bastard)
 11. "Shady" (featuring Intrigue & Beretta 9)
 12. "Break Bread" (featuring Jamie Sommers)
 13. "Bong Bong" (featuring Beretta 9 & Madame Cez)
 14. "Throw Your Flag Up" (featuring Crisis & Monk)
 15. "Be A Man"
 16. "Righteous Way" (featuring Junior Reid)
 17. "Build Strong" (featuring Tekitha)
 18. "Sickness"
 19. "Odyssey" (featuring Isaac Hayes Band)

Wu-Tang Clan – Iron Flag 
 01. "In the Hood"
 03. "Chrome Wheels"
 04. "Soul Power (Black Jungle)" (featuring Flavor Flav)
 05. "Uzi (Pinky Ring)"
 08. "Babies"
 09. "Radioactive (Four Assassins)"
 11. "Iron Flag"
 12. "Dashing (Reasons)"
 13. "The W"

2002

GZA – Legend of the Liquid Sword 
 14. "Rough Cut" (featuring Armel, Prodigal Sunn & 12 O'Clock)

Remedy – Code:Red 
 06. "Muslim And A Jew" (feat.  Cilva Ringz & RZA)

Tekitha – You 12" 
 A1. "You"

Wu-Tang Killa Bees – The Sting 
 01. "Intro"
 02. "Killa Beez" (RZA, U-God, Inspectah Deck, Suga Bang Bang, and Blue Raspberry)
 03. "Out Think Me Now" (Solomon Childs)
 06. "Bluntz, Martinez, Girlz & Gunz" (Warcloud)
 08. "Spend Money" (Lord Superb and Intrigue)
 09. "Take Up Space" (Lord Superb and Solomon Childs)
 12. "Spit That G" (Cappadonna, Solomon Childs, 12 O'Clock, Suga Bang Bang, Prodigal Sunn, and Timbo King)
 13. "Woodchuck" (Warcloud, Crisis, Timbo King, Meko the Pharaoh, and Cilvaringz)
 14. "G.A.T." (Black Knights, Northstar, Solomon Childs, and Shyheim)
 16. "When You Come Home" (Shyheim)
 17. "K.B. Ridin'" (RZA, Ghostface Killah, Method Man, Prodigal Sunn, ShaCronz, and Suga Bang Bang)

2003

9th Prince – Granddaddy Flow 
 13. "Tribute To The 5th Brother" (feat. RZA)

Eko Fresh – Ich Bin Jung Und Brauche Das Geld 
 07. "Der Don"

Northstar – Ducky 12" 
 A1. "Ducky"

RZA – Birth of a Prince 
 01. "Bob 'n I"
 02. "The Grunge"
 04. "Grits" (featuring Allah Real & Masta Killa)
 07. "You'll Never Know" (featuring Cilvaringz)
 08. "Drink, Smoke + Fuck"
 09. "The Whistle" (featuring Prodigal Sunn & Masta Killa)
 10. "The Drop Off"
 11. "Wherever I Go" (featuring Allah Real & CCF Division)
 12. "Koto Chotan" (featuring Masta Killa & Tash Mahogany)
 14. "Cherry Range" (featuring Xavier Naidoo)
 16. "See the Joy"

RZA & Xavier Naidoo – Ich Kenne Nichts (Das So Schön Ist Wie Du) CDS 
 01. "Ich Kenne Nichts (Das So Schön Ist Wie Du)"

Various artists – Bird Up: The Originals 
 05. "Bebop" (produced with Choco)

Various artists – Kill Bill Vol. 1 Original Soundtrack 
 12. "Crane / White Lightning" – performed by RZA & Charles Bernstein 
 18. "Yakuza Oren 1"
 19. "Banister Fight"

Various artists – The World According to RZA 
 01. "Intro" – performed by RZA
 02. "Mesmerize" – performed by Feven 
 03. "Det e så jag känner" – performed by Petter
 04. "On tha Ground" – performed by RZA feat. Diaz, Petter & Feven (Scandinavian Allstars)
 05. "The North Sea" – performed by RZA feat. Diaz
 06. "Saïan Intro" – performed by RZA
 07. "Saïan" – performed by RZA featuring Ghostface Killah & Saïan supa crew 
 08. "Please, Tends l'Oreille" – performed by Bams feat. U-God
 09. "Warning" – performed by Nap
 10. "Dedicace" – performed by Passi feat. RCFA
 11. "Seul Face à Lui" – performed by RZA feat. IAM
 12. "Souls on Fire" – performed by Xavier Naidoo feat. Deborah Cox 
 13. "Ich Weiss (On My Mind)" – performed by Curse
 14. "Black Star Line-Up" – performed by Afrob & Sekou 
 15. "I've Never Seen ..." – performed by RZA feat. Xavier Naidoo
 16. "Boing, Boing" – performed by RZA feat. Blade, Skinnyman & Ti2bs
 17. "Make Money, Money" – performed by Bronz'n'blak
 18. "Passaporto per Resistere" – performed by Frankie Hi-NRG MC 
 19. "Uzaktan Gelen Ses" – performed by Fuat, Bektas & Germ

2004

Fried – Fried 
 01. "When You Get Out Of Jail"

Ghostface Killah – The Pretty Toney Album 
 03. "Kunta Fly Shit"
 17. "Run" (featuring Jadakiss)

James Last – They Call Me Hansi 
 01. "The Lonely Shephard" (feat. RZA)

Masta Killa – No Said Date 
 03. "No Said Date"
 12. "Old Man" (featuring Ol' Dirty Bastard & RZA)
 14. "School" (featuring RZA)

Method Man – Tical 0: The Prequel 
 07. "The Turn" (featuring Raekwon)

Northstar – Bobby Digital Presents Northstar 
 04. "Red Rum" (featuring ShaCronz, Mikey Jarrett, Jr., and ShoShot)
 09. "See Me" (featuring Free Murda)
 10. "64" 
 14. "Destiny" (featuring Beretta 9)

Shyheim – The Greatest Story Never Told 
 07. "His.Story"
 10. "New Producers" (feat. Yumi)

Solomon Childs – Funeral Talk (The Eulogy) 
 20. "Out Think Me Now"

Various artists – Blade: Trinity (soundtrack) 
 01. "Fatal" – performed by RZA
 02. "I Gotta Get Paid – performed by Lil Flip, Ghostface Killah & Raekwon
 03. "When the Guns Come Out" – performed by WC, E-40 & Christ Bearer
 04. "Thirsty"	– performed by Ol' Dirty Bastard & Black Keith

Various artists – Kill Bill Vol. 2 Original Soundtrack 
 15. "Black Mamba" performed by The Wu-Tang Clan [hidden track]

Various artists – The Protector (soundtrack) 
(Produced entire soundtrack score, except track 3.)

Various artists – Unleashed (soundtrack) 
 22. "Baby Boy" – performed by Thea Van Seijen
 23. "Unleash Me" – performed by RZA feat. Prodigal Sunn & Christbearer)

Various artists – Wu-Tang Meets the Indie Culture 
 08. "Biochemical Equation" – performed by RZA & MF Doom

2005

Bams – Please, Tends L'Oreille 
 A2. "Please, Tends L'Oreille (featuring – D.Taz)

Ghostface Killah & Trife da God – Put It on the Line 
 16. "The Watch" (feat. Raekwon) 
 18. "The Sun" (feat. Raekwon, Slick Rick & RZA)

Ol' Dirty Bastard – A Son Unique 
 04. "Back In The Air" (featuring Ghostface Killah)
 07. "The Stomp Part II" (featuring RZA)
 10. "Dirty & Grimey" (featuring N.O.R.E.)
 12. "Skrilla"

Prodigal Sunn – Return of the Prodigal Sunn 
 04. "Brutality (The Grindz Remix)" (featuring C.C.F. Division)
 10. "Lovely Ladies" (featuring Scotty)

Raaddrr Van – The Booth, The Mic, The Lyrics 
 08. "Wit-N-Tent II"
 14. "Gimme"

Raekwon – State Of Grace 12" 
 A1. "State of Grace"

Various artists – Derailed (soundtrack) 
 02. "I Love You" – performed by  Thea & RZA
 05. "50 Ways To Leave Your Lover" – performed by Grayson Hill
 06. "Really Want None" – performed by Free Murda
 10. "Love" – performed by  Thea

Various artists – Impulsive! Revolutionary Jazz Reworked 
 02. "II BS"

2006

La the Darkman – Return Of The Darkman Mixtape 
 12. "This Thing" (feat. Method Man & RZA)
 19. "Wu World Order" (feat. RZA)

Method Man – 4:21... The Day After 
 01. "Intro"
 08. "4:20" (featuring Streetlife & Carlton Fisk) (produced with Beretta 9.)
 10. "The Glide" (featuring Raekwon, U-God & La the Darkman)
 15. "Konichiwa Bitches"
 17. "Walk On" (feat. Redman) (produced with Versatile & Erick Sermon.)
 19. "Presidential MC" (featuring Raekwon & RZA)

Solomon Childs – The Wake 
 1- 5. "My Guns is all I Got to Bust"

Sunz Of Man – The Old Testament 
 12. "Inmates To The Fire"

Warcloud – Smugglin Booze In The Graveyard 
 03. "The Trap Door"
 10. "Lost Soldier Of Wu-Tang"

2007

Cilvaringz – I 
 03. "The Weeping Tiger" (feat. Raekwon, RZA & Ghostface Killah)
 05. "Death to America" (produced with Cilvaringz.) 
 06. "In the Name of Allah" (feat. Masta Killa, Killah Priest, RZA & Shabazz The Disciple) (produced with Cilvaringz.) 
 07. "Jewels" (feat GZA)
 10. "Caravanserai – Chapter I" (feat. Raekwon)
 12. "Caravanserai – Chapter II" (feat. Salah Edin & Raekwon) (produced with Cilvaringz.) 
 16. "Forever Michael (Wacko Tablo)"

Free Murda – Let Freedom Reign 
 02. "My Black Nina" (featuring RZA & Shacronz)
 09. "This 1's For Dirt"
 17. "Yeah!"

Various artists – Afro Samurai: The Album 
 01. "Afro Theme"
 02. "Afro Intro" 
 03. "Certified Samurai" (Featuring Talib Kweli, Lil Free & Suga Bang)
 04. "Just a Lil Dude "Who Dat Ovah There"" (Featuring Q-Tip & Free Murder)
 05. "Afro's Father Fight" 
 08. "Bazooka Fight I"
 09. "Who Is Tha Man?" (Featuring Reverend William Burke)
 10. "Ninjaman"
 11. "Cameo Afro" (Featuring Big Daddy Kane, GZA & Suga Bang)
 12. "Tears of a Samurai" 
 13. "Take Sword Pt. I" (Featuring Berretta 9)
 14. "The Empty 7 Theme" 
 16. "Take Sword Pt. II" (Featuring 60 Second Assassin & True Master)
 17. "Bazooka Fight II" 
 18. "Fury in My Eyes/Revenge" (Featuring Thea Van Seijen)
 19. "Afro Samurai Theme' (First Movement)" 
 20. "Afro Samurai Theme (Second Movement)" 
 22. "So Fly"  (featuring Division)
 23. "We All We Got" (featuring Black Knights)
 24. "Glorious Day" (Featuring Dexter Wiggles)
 25. "Series Outro"

Wu-Tang Clan – 8 Diagrams 
 01. "Campfire"
 02. "Take It Back" (produced with Easy Mo Bee.)  
 03. "Get Them Out Ya Way Pa"
 04. "Rushing Elephants"
 05. "Unpredictable" (featuring Dexter Wiggle)
 06. "The Heart Gently Weeps" (featuring Erykah Badu, Dhani Harrison & John Frusciante) (produced with George Drakoulias.)  
 07. "Wolves" (featuring George Clinton)
 08. "Gun Will Go" (featuring Sunny Valentine)
 09. "Sunlight"
 10. "Stick Me for My Riches" (featuring Gerald Alston) (produced with Mathematics.)
 11. "Starter" (featuring Sunny Valentine & Tash Mahogany)
 12. "Windmill"
 13. "Weak Spot" (produced with George Drakoulias.)
 14. "Life Changes"

2008

Brooklyn Zu – Chamber #9, Verse 32 
 06. "Knock, Knock" (feat. GZA)

GZA – Pro Tools 
 09. "Paper Plate" 
 15. "Life Is a Movie" (featuring RZA & Irfane Khan-Acito)

RZA – Digi Snacks 
 01. "Digi Snacks Intro" (featuring Understanding) 
 03. "You Can't Stop Me Now" (featuring Inspectah Deck) (produced with George Drakoulias.)
 05. "Booby Trap" (featuring Dexter Wiggles) (produced with George Drakoulias.)
 06. "Try Ya Ya Ya" (featuring Monk & Thea Van Seijen) (produced with Che Vicious.) 
 07. "Good Night" (featuring Rev William Burk, Crisis & Thea Van Seijen
 08. "No Regrets"
 09. "Money Don't Own Me" (featuring Monk & Stone Mecca)
 11. "Drama" (featuring Monk & Thea Van Seijen)
 12. "Up Again" (featuring John Frusciante, Beretta 9, Rev William Burk, George Clinton & El DeBarge) (produced with John Frusciante.)
 14. "Love Is Digi/Part II" (featuring Beretta 9, Crisis & Thea Van Seijen)
 15. "O Day"
 16. "Don't Be Afraid"
 17. "The Wolf"

2009

Raekwon – Only Built 4 Cuban Linx... Pt. II 
 06. "Black Mozart" (featuring Inspectah Deck, RZA & Tash Mahogany)
 08. "New Wu" (featuring Ghostface Killah & Method Man)
 30. "Rockstars" (featuring Inspectah Deck, GZA, Thea Van Seijen & Stone Mecca) [iTunes Gold Deluxe Edition bonus track]

Various artists – The RZA Presents: Afro Samurai Resurrection OST 
 01. "Combat (Afro Season II Open Theme)" – performed by RZA, and P. Dot
 02. "You Already Know" – performed by	Inspectah Deck, Kool G Rap & Suga Bang Bang
 03. "Blood Thicker Than Mud "Family Affair" – performed by Reverend William Burk, Sly Stone & Stone Mecca
 04. "Whar" – performed by Kool G Rap, Ghostface Killah, RZA & Tash Mahogany
 05. "Girl Samurai Lullaby" – performed by Rah Digga & Stone Mecca
 06. "Fight For You" – performed by Thea Van Seijen
 07. "Bitch Gonna Get Ya'" – performed by Rah Digga
 08. "Bloody Days Bloody Nights" – performed by Prodigal Sunn & Thea Van Seijen
 09. "Kill Kill Kill" – performed by Monk
 10. "Nappy Afro" – performed by Boy Jones
 11. "Bloody Samurai" – performed by Black Knights, Dexter Wiggles & Thea Van Seijen
 12. "Dead Birds" – performed by Sunz Of Man & Shavo Odadjian
 13. "Arch Nemesis" – performed by Ace & MoeRoc
 14. "Brother's Keeper" – performed by RZA, Reverend William Burk & Infinite
 15. "Yellow Jackets" – performed by Ace & MoeRoc
 16. "Take The Sword Part III"	– performed by 60 Second Assassin, Leggezin, Crisis, Christbearer, Monk, Tre Irie, Beretta 9, Bobby Digital & Reverend William Burk
 17. "Number One Samurai (Afro Season II Outro)" – performed by RZA & 9th Prince

Various artists – Wu-Tang Chamber Music 
 16. "NYC Crack" (RZA featuring Thea Van Seijen) (produced with Fizzy Womack & Andrew Kelley.)

2010

9th Prince – One Man Army 
 07. "Another Summer Love"

60 Second Assassin – Remarkable Timing 
 06. "Warzone (Remix)" (feat. RZA)

Achozen – Deuces 
 01. "Deuces"
 02. "Salute/Sacrifice"
 03. "Immaculate" (featuring Killah Priest & Shukura Holliday)
 04. "If I Had A Gun" (featuring Brooklyn Zu & Rugged Monk)
 05. "I Am You" (featuring Rayes Bek)

Method Man, Ghostface Killah & Raekwon – Wu-Massacre 
 05. "Our Dreams"

Remedy – It All Comes Down to This 
 02. "Streets Are Watchin"
 07. "Black And White Millionaires" (featuring – King Just & Lounge Lo)
 20. "The Duelist"

Kanye West – My Beautiful Dark Twisted Fantasy 
 01. "Dark Fantasy" (produced with Kanye West, No I.D., Jeff Bhasker, Mike Dean.)

Wu-Tang Killa Bees – Pollen: The Swarm Part Three 
 04. "Dirts The Boogie"
 06. "M.E.F."
 12. "No Game Around Here"
 13. "Into You"
 15. "Flight Of The Killer Bees"

2011

Travis Barker – Give the Drummer Some 
 03. "Carry It" (featuring RZA, Raekwon & Tom Morello)

The Game – Purp & Patron 
 13. "Heart Breaker" (featuring Rev. Burke)

IronKap – The Almighty Ironkap 
 01. "Je To Sexy Bejt Zase Tady"

M-80 – Taking Back What's Mine 
 04. "3 Degrees" (feat. RZA & Solomon Childs)

Catherine Ringer – Ring n' Roll 
 05. "Prends-Moi"

Kanye West & Jay Z – Watch the Throne 
 06. "New Day" (produced with Kanye West, Mike Dean & Ken Lewis.)

2012

Various artists – The Man with the Iron Fists (soundtrack) 
 01. "The Baddest Man Alive" – performed by The Black Keys and RZA (produced with The Black Keys.)
 03. "White Dress" – performed by Kanye West (produced with Kanye West, Boogz & Tapez.)
 09. "Just Blowin' in the Wind" – performed by RZA and Flatbush Zombies
 15. 	"I Go Hard" – performed by Ghostface Killah, Boy Jones and Wiz Khalifa

2013

Earl Sweatshirt – Doris 
 12. "Molasses" (featuring RZA) (produced with Christian Rich.)

Killah Priest – The Psychic World of Walter Reed 
 1–20. "Energy Work"
 2–9. 	"Fire Stone"

Talib Kweli – Prisoner of Conscious 
 11. "Rocket Ships" (featuring Busta Rhymes)

Monsieur M – Les Zoniers 
 13. "Calme Ta Joie!"

Tony Touch – The Piece Maker 3: Return of the 50 MC's 
 13. "Unorthodox" (featuring Raekwon, JD Era, Ghostface Killah & RZA) (produced with Tony Touch & Psycho Les.)

U-God – The Keynote Speaker 
 12. "Room Keep Spinning"
 14. "Get Mine"
 18. "Be Right There"

2014

Black Knights – Every Night is Still a Black Knight 
 03. "Designated Driver"
 05. "Wash Me"
 06. "I See Ya"
 08. "Fallen Angel"
 10. "Kiss"
 11. "Surprise"

Wu-Tang Clan – A Better Tomorrow 
 01. "Ruckus in B Minor" (produced with Rick Rubin.)
 02. "Felt"
 03. "40th Street Black / We Will Fight" (produced with Mathematics.)
 04. "Mistaken Identity" (featuring Streetlife)
 05. "Hold the Heater"
 06. "Crushed Egos" (produced with Adrian Younge.)
 08. "Miracle" (produced with 4th Disciple.)
 09. "Preacher's Daughter"
 10. "Pioneer the Frontier"
 12. "Ron O'Neal" (featuring Nathaniel)
 13. "A Better Tomorrow" (featuring Tekitha)
 14. "Never Let Go"
 15. "Wu-Tang Reunion"

2016

Banks & Steelz – Anything But Words 
(Note: All tracks co-produced by Paul Banks, except where noted.)
 02. "Ana Electronic"
 04. "Speedway Sonora"
 05. "Wild Season" (featuring Florence Welch)
 06. "Anything But Words" (produced with Ari Levine & Paul Banks.)
 07. "Conceal"
 08. "Love and War" (featuring Ghostface Killah)
 09. "Can't Hardly Feel"
 10. "One by One"
 11. "Gonna Make It"
 12. "Point of View" (featuring Method Man and Masta Killa)

2017

A$AP Mob – Cozy Tapes Vol. 2: Too Cozy 
 15. "What Happens" (featuring ASAP Rocky, ASAP Ferg, ASAP Twelvyy, Playboi Carti, Joey Badass, Kirk Knight, Nyck Caution, Meechy Darko, and Zombie Juice)

Masta Killa – Loyalty Is Royalty 
 06. "Wise Words from the RZA" (featuring RZA)

Wu-Tang Clan – Silicon Valley Soundtrack 
 11. "Don't Stop"

2019

Nas – The Lost Tapes II 
 05. "Tanasia"
 11. "Highly Favored"

Miley Cyrus – She Is Coming 
 03. "D.R.E.A.M." (featuring Ghostface Killah) produced with John Cunningham

Berner – La Plaza 
 02. "La Plaza" (featuring Wiz Khalifa & Snoop Dogg)

2020

PxRo – Great Adventures Of PxRo 
 05. "M.A.N. Pt.1 (Father 2 Son)" (featuring Masta Killa)
 12. "M.A.N. (Money, Autority, Need) Pt. 2" (featuring Masta Killa, Shaka Amazulu The 7th & Techsolo)

2022

Killah Priest – The Holocaust - Savage Sanctuary 
 12. "Diary Of A Madman Pt. 2" (featuring Gravediggaz & Black Knights)

RZA - RZA Presents: Bobby Digital and the Pit of Snakes 
(produced by RZA and Stone Mecca) 
 1 "Under the Sun"
 2 "Trouble Shooting"
 3 "Something Going On"
 4 "We Push"
 5 "Cowards"
 6 "Fight to Win"
 7 "Celebrate"
 8 "Live Your Own Rhythm (Outro)"

RZA - Minions: The Rise of Gru (soundtrack) 
 18 "Kung Fu Suite"

Westside Gunn - 10 
 1 "Intro" (featuring AA Rashid)

Albums executive produced
 1993: Enter the Wu-Tang (36 Chambers) by Wu-Tang Clan
 1994: Tical  by Method Man
 1995: Return to the 36 Chambers: The Dirty Version by Ol Dirty Bastard
 1995: Only Built 4 Cuban Linx... by Raekwon
 1995: Liquid Swords by GZA
 1996: Ironman by Ghostface Killah
 1997: Wu-Tang Forever by Wu-Tang Clan
 1997: The Pick, the Sickle and the Shovel by Gravediggaz
 1998: The Pillage by Cappadonna
 1998: Bobby Digital in Stereo by RZA
 1999: Beneath the Surface by GZA
 1999: Blackout! by Method Man and Redman
 1999: Uncontrolled Substance by Inspectah Deck
 1999: Golden Arms Redemption by U-God
 1999: Manchild by Shyheim
 1999: Wu-Syndicate by Wu-Syndicate
 2000: Supreme Clientele by Ghostface Killah
 2000: The W by Wu-Tang Clan
 2001: Bulletproof Wallets by Ghostface Killah
 2001: Iron Flag by Wu-Tang Clan
 2003: Birth of a Prince by RZA
 2004: Bobby Digital Presents Northstar by Northstar
 2007: I by Cilvaringz
 2007: Let Freedom Reign by Free Murda
 2007: Afro Samurai produced by RZA
 2007: 8 Diagrams by Wu-Tang Clan
 2009: Only Built 4 Cuban Linx II by Raekwon
 2009: Afro Samurai: Resurrection produced by RZA
 2012: The Man with the Iron Fists by Various artists
 2013: Twelve Reasons to Die by Ghostface Killah
 2013: The Keynote Speaker by U-God
 2014: A Better Tomorrow by Wu-Tang Clan
 2017: The Saga Continues by Wu-Tang Clan

References

Production discographies
 
 
Hip hop discographies
Discographies of American artists